The Texas Longhorns women's volleyball team represents The University of Texas at Austin in NCAA Division I intercollegiate women's volleyball competition. The Longhorns currently compete in the Big 12 Conference.

Texas has won four volleyball national championships – one AIAW championship in 1981 and three NCAA championships in 1988, 2012, and 2022. Beginning with the 1981 season, they have qualified for the AIAW/NCAA tournament every year except for two (40 of 42 seasons) and the most recent 19 years (2004-2022).

The volleyball program was founded in 1974. It has had seven head coaches in its history – the first four lasted just 1–2 years each: Pam Lampley (1974), Cheryl Lyman (1975), Jody Conradt (1976–77) and Linda Lowery (1978-79). Mick Haley coached from 1980 to 1996 before leaving to coach the Olympic team followed by the head coaching job at USC. Jim Moore coached 1997–2000 and Jerritt Elliott has coached Texas since 2001.

Texas reached the NCAA Final Four in 1986, 1987, 1988, 1995, 2008, 2009, 2010, 2012, 2013, 2014, 2015, 2016 and 2020, winning NCAA championships in 1988, 2012, and 2022.

During the 41-year history (1982-2022) of the AVCA Coaches Poll, the Longhorns have been ranked in the Top 10 in the final poll in 30 seasons, including the last 17 years at #8 or better (2006-2022). Only Nebraska and Stanford have more Top 10 final appearances than Texas.

Texas has dominated Big XII play for many years.  Over the last 14 seasons (2007-2020), Texas has won 94% of their Big XII matches, finishing in first place twelve times and second place twice. Overall, Texas has captured the Big XII Volleyball championship fourteen times: in 1997, 2007–2009, 2011–2015 and 2017–2021.

During Texas Volleyball's fourteen seasons in the predecessor Southwest Conference (1982-1995), Texas was conference champion thirteen times and runner-up once.

Through 2018, Texas Volleyball has had 33 AVCA Division I All Americans, the fourth most of any program (through 2017).

Program record and history

Year by year results

1986–1988
Women's volleyball joined the NCAA in 1982. Texas made its first NCAA final four in 1986, coming in third place overall and finishing the year with a 29–6 record. In 1987, the team made it back to the final four, once again coming into third place and finishing the season with a 25–10 record.

In 1988, Texas broke through and won the NCAA national championship by sweeping Hawai'i 3–0. Texas became the first team in NCAA history (and, as of 2017, remains one of two schools to do so) to sweep every NCAA tournament opponent 3-0 en route to winning the NCAA volleyball championship.

1995–1996
In 1995, Texas made it to the championship match, falling to Nebraska 3–1. Also in 1995, Demetria Sance became the program's first ever player to be named the National Freshman of the Year. University of Texas joined the Big XII starting in 1996. Coach Mick Haley left the University Texas to manage the U.S. Olympic Team following a successful 1996 season.

1997–2006: two coach changes but modest results
Haley's replacement Jim Moore's started strong by winning the Big XII in 1997, but his record began to worsen by 1999. In the disastrous 2000 season, a first ever losing record, a worst ever seventh place conference finish and missing the NCAA tournament for the first time, lead to Moore's replacement by Jerritt Elliot before the 2001 season. In 2003, Texas finished at 15–14, again finished seventh in the conference and again missed the NCAA tournament under Elliott. However, the Longhorns began to rebound for good in 2004 (Elliott's fourth year). In 2006, although finishing third in the conference, the Longhorns reached their first NCAA regional final in eight years.

2007–2012 (National Title)
In 2007, Texas captured its second ever Big 12 title (and first conference title in ten years), sharing it with Nebraska and finished with a 19–1 conference record. The 2007 squad finished off the season with a 27–4 record and made it to the NCAA regional finals as the tournament's overall 4th seed. 2007 Big 12 Freshman of the Year Juliann Faucette became the program's second ever AVCA National Freshman of the Year and earned AVCA First Team All-America honors – becoming only the fourth true freshman in eight years to be named on the first team.

In 2008, Texas shared the Big 12 title with Nebraska with an 18–2 record. The team finished 29–4 overall, making it to the NCAA Final Four, where they took a 2–0 lead on Stanford but lost the next three to lose in five sets. Junior outside hitter Destinee Hooker was named to the Final Four All-Tournament Team and was also a Honda Sports Award nominee for the top volleyball player in the country. Hooker, junior Ashley Engle and senior Lauren Paolini were also named AVCA First Team All-Americans.

Led by senior Destinee Hooker, the 2009 Texas volleyball team lost just one regular season match to Iowa State and was ranked No. 2 in the country all season long. In the 2009 NCAA tournament, the Longhorns defeated Big-12 opponent Nebraska in the regional final, becoming the first team to ever beat Nebraska three times in a season. In the Final Four, the team soundly defeated Minnesota, and met No. 1 and undefeated Penn State in the final.

Texas looked to be on the brink of a huge upset, as they went up 2 sets to 0 against the Lions. However, Penn State stormed back to push the match to a fifth set, which they eventually won, 15–13. Penn State won their third consecutive NCAA title and denied Texas its first NCAA title since 1988. Despite the loss, Destinee Hooker was named the Final Four's Most Outstanding Player, as she had 34 kills in the championship match, which is the most kills by a single player in the NCAA final's history. It was also Hooker's career high in a single match, her final match as a collegiate player. Because of the high level of play by both teams throughout the long match, many people believe that it was the best NCAA final in history.

In 2012, Texas once again advanced to the NCAA final game, in which they played Oregon for the national championship. Texas swept the Ducks, 3–0, and claimed its first national title in volleyball since 1988, giving the university its 50th overall national championship, 42 of which are NCAA championships.

2013–2018
The program continued to excel following their national championship. In 2013 and 2014, they won the Big 12 and advanced to the national semifinals. In 2015, they once again won the Big 12 and advanced to the national championship game, but lost to Nebraska. In 2016, they finished second in the Big 12, snapping a streak of five consecutive Big 12 titles. However, they once again advanced to the national championship game, this time losing to Stanford.

Texas, with a perfect 16–0 record, won the Big 12 championship in 2017 for the tenth time. In the 2017 NCAA tournament Texas was again eliminated by Stanford, this time by a 3–0 score in the Regional Final.

In 2018, despite two losses to nemesis, and eventual National Champion, Stanford during the regular season, Texas continued its winning ways at the conference level by easily clinching the Big 12 with a 15–1 record.

Texas was seeded #5 in the 2018 NCAA Tournament. Texas defeated Stephen F Austin in the first round and Texas State in the second round each by a 3–0 score. Texas next beat Michigan 3–1 in the third round. However, Texas then lost 0–3 to #4 seed and regional host BYU in the Regional Final.

Texas reached the Regional Final (round of 8) thirteen years in a row (2006-2018), advanced to the Final Four in 8 of 12 years (2008–2010, 2012–2016), and had three runner-up finishes 2009, 2015–2016, but won the NCAA championship just once over this period (in 2012).

20192022 (National Title)
Early in 2019, Texas had yet another loss to eventual National Champion Stanford and their first ever loss to an improved (final ranking #24) Rice team but also had two significant early season wins over (#4) Minnesota and (#17) BYU. During conference play, Texas swept NCAA #1 and undefeated Baylor 3–0 at home in late October in Austin to become the new NCAA #1. However, Baylor returned the favor by defeating Texas 3–2 in Waco in mid-November to retake NCAA #1. Texas at 15-1 was 2019 co-champion of the Big 12 with Baylor.

Texas was seeded #2 in the 2019 NCAA Tournament. Texas beat U. Albany 3–0 in the first round. Texas survived 3–2 over UCSB in the second round. Texas then was surprisingly upset by unranked Louisville 3–2 in the regional semifinal—Texas's worst NCAA Tournament showing since 2005. It snapped Texas' 36 match home winning streak, Texas' streak of 13 straight Regional Finals appearances and was Louisville's first ever appearance in the Regional Final. Louisville was promptly swept 3–0 in the Regional Final by #7 Minnesota who Texas had swept during the regular season.

Texas was seeded #4 in the 2020–21 NCAA Tournament, which was played in April 2021 due to COVID-19. Texas received a bye in the first round and beat Wright State 3–0 in the second round. Texas beat traditional volleyball power Penn State 3–1 in the regional semifinal and advanced to their first final 4 since 2016 by beating Nebraska 3–1 in Omaha. Texas then advanced to the Finals by sweeping previously undefeated #1 Wisconsin 3–0, but losing there 3–1 to first-time Final Four participant Kentucky.

In 2021, Texas spent much of the regular season undefeated and #1 ranked before losing one of two matches to Baylor. Despite the loss, Texas again won the Big XII with a 15–1 record. Texas was seeded #2 in the 2021 NCAA Tournament. Texas beat Sacred Heart 3–0 in the first round. Texas beat Rice 3–0 in the second round. After being down 2–0, Texas battled back to beat #15 Washington 3–2 in the regional semifinal. In the regional final, Texas lost to former SWC foe (& only present or past conference foe against which Texas has a losing record) #10 Nebraska 3–1.

In 2022, Texas again spent much of the regular season #1 ranked except for a brief period at #2 immediately following their only loss of the regular season—to Iowa State. Despite the loss, Texas again won the Big XII with a 15–1 record. Texas at 22-1 was seeded #1 overall in the 2022 NCAA Tournament. Texas beat Farleigh Dickinson 3–0 in the first round (including a dominating 25–6 win in the first set). Texas has won all 39 first round matches that it has contested in the NCAA tournament. Texas beat Georgia 3–0 in the second round. Texas has won its last 17 consecutive NCAA second round matches (2006–22). Texas then proceeded to defeat both #4 seed Marquette and #2 seed Ohio State by 3-1 scores to clinch the Regional Final and a trip to Omaha for the final four. In Omaha, Texas won its fourth national title by defeating San Diego 3–1 in the semis and then sweeping #1 seed Louisville 3–0 in the finals. Outside hitter Logan Eggleston was AVCA player of the year during the regular 2022 season and also MVP of the 2022 NCAA volleyball tournament.

All-time series records

Beach volleyball

In April 2008, the American Volleyball Coaches Association and Association of Volleyball Professionals sponsored the third annual Collegiate Beach Volleyball Championship, adhering to NCAA guidelines for college volleyball. The Longhorns won the championship with a roster consisting of Jennifer Doris, Ashley Engle, Elizabeth Graham, Kiley Hall, Alyson Jennings, Heather Kisner, Chelsey Klein, Alex Lewis and Michelle Moriarty. Each school fielded four teams of two players. The field included Nebraska, Clemson, San Diego, USC, Texas and Wisconsin, all of whom were ranked in the 2007 Coaches Top 25 final poll (indoor). The Longhorns had finished the 2007 season ranked sixth.

On August 30, 2022, UT announced the addition of Beach Volleyball as the 21st Intercollegiate Sport at the University of Texas.

Home Court
Gregory Gymnasium (1974-1989, 1998–2019, 2021–Present)
Frank Erwin Center (1984, 1986–1990, 1996–1997)(select games), 2020 (due to Covid restriction)
Recreational Sports Center (1990-1997)(during renovation of Gregory Gym)

Attendance record

See also
List of NCAA Division I women's volleyball programs

References

External links